Austin Calitro (born January 10, 1994) is an American football linebacker who is a free agent. He played college football at Villanova.

College career
Calitro was selected to the All-CAA Football first-team. He also led Villanova in total tackles with 90 and forced fumbles with 3 in his junior season.

Professional career

New York Jets
Calitro signed with the New York Jets as an undrafted free agent on May 5, 2017. He was waived by the Jets on May 15, 2017.

San Francisco 49ers
On August 7, 2017, Calitro signed with the San Francisco 49ers. He was waived on September 2, 2017.

Seattle Seahawks
On September 4, 2017, Calitro was signed to the Seattle Seahawks' practice squad. He was released on September 19, 2017.

Cleveland Browns
On October 3, 2017, Calitro was signed to the Cleveland Browns' practice squad. He signed a reserve/future contract with the Browns on January 1, 2018.

On May 18, 2018, Calitro was waived by the Browns.

Seattle Seahawks (second stint)
On June 13, 2018, Calitro signed with the Seattle Seahawks. He played in his first NFL game on September 9, 2018, in a 27–24 loss to the Denver Broncos. He made five tackles. On September 17, he started against the Chicago Bears on Monday Night Football in week 2.

On September 2, 2019, Calitro was waived by the Seahawks.

Jacksonville Jaguars
On September 3, 2019, Calitro was claimed off waivers by the Jacksonville Jaguars.

Calitro re-signed with the Jaguars on April 22, 2020. On April 27, 2020, he was waived.

Cincinnati Bengals
On April 28, 2020, Calitro was claimed off waivers by the Cincinnati Bengals.

Denver Broncos
On September 4, 2020, Calitro was traded to the Denver Broncos for Christian Covington. He was placed on injured reserve on September 28, 2020. He was activated on October 31.

Chicago Bears
On May 17, 2021, Calitro signed with the Chicago Bears. He was placed on injured reserve on August 22, 2021, and released three days later.

Cincinnati Bengals (second stint)
On November 15, 2021, Calitro was signed to the Cincinnati Bengals practice squad. He was promoted to the active roster on December 27. He was waived on January 10, 2022, and re-signed to the practice squad.

New York Giants
On July 28, 2022, Calitro was signed by the New York Giants. On November 23, 2022, he was waived.

Las Vegas Raiders
On December 6, 2022, Calitro was signed by the Las Vegas Raiders' practice squad. He was released on December 21. He was re-signed to the practice squad six days later.

References

External links
Villanova Wildcats bio
New York Jets bio

Living people
1994 births
American football linebackers
Chicago Bears players
Cincinnati Bengals players
Cleveland Browns players
Danbury High School alumni
Denver Broncos players
Jacksonville Jaguars players
Las Vegas Raiders players
New York Giants players
New York Jets players
Players of American football from Connecticut
San Francisco 49ers players
Seattle Seahawks players
Sportspeople from Danbury, Connecticut
Villanova Wildcats football players